Eleutheria (minor planet designation: 567 Eleutheria) is a minor planet orbiting the Sun.

References

External links
 
 

Background asteroids
Eleutheria
Eleutheria
CFB:-type asteroids (Tholen)
19050528